IRIG may mean:

 The Inter-Range Instrumentation Group, a standards publishing body
 Inter-range instrumentation group time codes, the best known IRIG standards
 Irig, Serbia, a town and municipality in the Srem District of Vojvodina, Serbia